Edward Carson Waller III (January 24, 1926 – March 2, 2021) was a vice admiral in the United States Navy. He was Superintendent of the United States Naval Academy in Annapolis, Maryland from August 22, 1981 to retirement on August 31, 1983. A 1949 graduate of the Naval Academy, he was married to Margaret Clifford Gelly. She died May 15, 2013 at the age of 82. He is a recipient of the Navy Distinguished Service Medal and Legion of Merit.

References

External links
Edward C. Waller Papers, 1971–1983 (bulk 1976–1983) MS 554 held by Special Collections & Archives, Nimitz Library at the United States Naval Academy

Superintendents of the United States Naval Academy
United States Navy admirals
1926 births
2021 deaths
Military personnel from Chicago
Recipients of the Navy Distinguished Service Medal
Recipients of the Legion of Merit
Burials at the United States Naval Academy Cemetery